Pushkaram is the Hindu festival about the 12 auspicious rivers in India. One of the 12 rivers is the river Tapti. Usually, one river is worshipped every year, but sometimes that changes, one of these rivers have a celebration and thousands of people dive in to take a bath as worship. The Rashi or the Hindu zodiac sign for this river is Dhanus or Sagittarius.

Religious festivals in India
Water and Hinduism
Hindu festivals